Below is a List of heads of government of Spain.

Before 1823
There is no specific date when the office of Prime Minister first appeared as the role was not created, but rather evolved over a period of time through merger of duties.

Secretaries of the Universal Bureau

John II (1406–1454)
 Álvaro de Luna

Henry IV (1454–1474)
 Juan Pacheco
 Beltrán de la Cueva
 Miguel Lucas de Iranzo

Philip III (1598–1621)
 Francisco de Sandoval y Rojas (1598–1618)
 Cristóbal Gómez de Sandoval y de la Cerda (1619–1621)

Philip IV (1621–1665)
 Baltasar de Zúñiga (1621–1622)
 Gaspar de Guzmán, Count-Duke of Olivares (1622–1643)
 Luis de Haro (1643–1661)

Charles II (1665–1700)
 Juan Everardo Nithard (1666–1669)
 Fernando de Valenzuela (1671–1676)
 Juan José de Austria (1677–1679)
 Duque de Medinaceli (1679–1685) 
 Conde de Oropesa (1685–1691)
 Juan de Angulo (1691–1694)
 Alonso Gaspar Carnero López de Zárate (1694–1695)
 Juan de Larrea (1695–1697)
 Juan Antonio López de Zárate (1697–1698)
 Antonio de Ubilla (1698–1705)

First secretaries of state

List of officeholders

Kingdom of Spain (18231868)
Governments:

Democratic Sexennium and first Republic (18681874)
Governments:

Bourbon Restoration in Spain (18741931)
Governments:

Second Spanish Republic (19311939)
Governments:

Francoist Spain (19361975)
Governments:

Kingdom of Spain (1975present)
Governments:

See also
List of heads of state of Spain
List of Spanish monarchs
President of the Republic (Spain)
List of Spanish regents
Prime Minister of Spain

Notes

References

Government of Spain
Politics of Spain
Prime Ministers
Spain